Stanville (formerly Mare Creek) is an unincorporated community in Floyd County, Kentucky, United States.

The United States Census Bureau, treats Stanville and the nearby community of Betsy Layne as a combined Census County Division. It had a population of 4,601 at the 2020 census. The CCD also includes the communities of Banner, Dana, Harold, Ivel and Tram.

Notable people
Grady Wallace, All-American basketball player, born in Mare Creek

See also
Statue of Abraham Lincoln (Stanville, Kentucky)

References

Unincorporated communities in Floyd County, Kentucky
Unincorporated communities in Kentucky